Anthonie is a Dutch and masculine given name transliterated from Antonius in use in the Netherlands, Greenland, Suriname, Republic of Karelia, South Africa, Namibia, Belgium and Indonesia. The same spelling is a Norwegian feminine given name that is an alternate name to Antonie in use in Norway. The spellings Antonie and Anthonij were basically interchangeable in Dutch until the 19th century.  Notable people with the name include:

Anthonie Andriessen (1746–1813), Dutch landscape and genre painter
Anthonie Beerstraaten (1646–aft.1664), Dutch landscape and genre painter
Anthonie Blocklandt van Montfoort (1533–1583), Dutch painter
Anthonie van Borssom (1631–1677), Dutch landscape painter
Anthonie Jansz. van der Croos (1606–1662), Dutch painter
Anthonie Crussens (c. 1635 – 1665), Flemish draughtsman and printmaker
Anthonie van Dale (1638–1708), Dutch Mennonite preacher, physician and writer
Anthonie van Diemen (1593–1645), Governor-General of the Dutch East Indies
Anthonie Duyck (1560–1629), Grand Pensionary of Holland from 1621 to 1629
Anthonie Ferreira (born 1955), South African cricketer
Anthonie Gronum (born 1985), South African rugby player
Anthonie Hals (1621–1691), Dutch portrait and genre painter
Anthonie Heinsius (1641–1720), Grand Pensionary of Holland from 1689 to 1720
Anthonie van der Heim (1693–1746), Grand Pensionary of Holland from 1737 to 1746
Anthonie Johannes Theodorus Janse (1877–1970), Dutch-born South African entomologist
Anthonie Leemans (1631–1673), Dutch still life painter
Anthonie de Lorme (1610–1673), Dutch church interior painter
Anthonie Rouwenhorst Mulder (1848–1901), Dutch engineer and foreign advisor in Japan
Anthonie Cornelis Oudemans (1858–1943), Dutch zoologist
Anthonie Palamedesz. (1602–1673), Dutch genre and portrait painter
Anthonie II Schetz (1564–1641), Flemish military commander in Spanish service
Anthonie Wilhelmus Verhoef (born 1946), Dutch painter, ceramist and art lecturer
Anthonie Verstraelen (1593–1641), Dutch winter landscape painter
Anthonie Waldorp (1803–1866), Dutch landscape painter

See also

Anthoni, name
Anthony (disambiguation)
Anthonij
Anthonio (disambiguation)
Anton (disambiguation)
Antonia (disambiguation)
Antonie (given name)
Antoine
Antonio
Antonius
Antony (disambiguation)
Tony (disambiguation)

References

Dutch masculine given names
Norwegian feminine given names